Magyar Rádió (MR, The Hungarian Radio Corporation, also known internationally as Radio Budapest) is Hungary's publicly funded radio broadcasting organisation. It is also the country's official international broadcasting station.

Domestic networks 
With its headquarters in Budapest and several regional offices around the country, MR is responsible for public service broadcasting throughout the Hungarian Republic. As well as maintaining nine regional studios, the corporation produces three nationwide Hungarian-language radio channels (Kossuth, Petőfi, and Bartók) covering the full range of public-service radio provision, and a fourth channel (MR4) aimed at the country's linguistic minorities.

Kossuth Rádió

Named after Lajos Kossuth, the channel is the official radio station of Hungary. It is the flagship channel of the Hungarian Radio. Created in 1925, the station nowadays has over 3 million listeners per day. It primarily broadcasts news, including interviews, discussions, reports and other speech-based programmes.

Petőfi Rádió 
Named after the poet Sándor Petőfi, the station is aimed at the younger generation and broadcasts pop music.

Bartók Rádió 
Named after the composer Béla Bartók, this is a dedicated classical music station. It hosts high culture talk programmes in addition to orchestral and opera music. Supposedly, only a few thousand people listen to this station and proposals to terminate Rádió Bartók have been made several times, but never enacted.

Nemzetiségi Rádió  
This radio channel airs programmes in languages of national minorities of Hungary.

Parlamenti Adások 
Parliamentarian broadcasts.

Dankó Rádió 
Named after Pista Dankó, this radio station airs regional content throughout Hungary, plays folk music and broadcasts operetta shows. It is available round the clock on the internet and FM. Also it broadcasts via mediumwave on weekdays from 4:30am to 9:05pm and on weekends from 5:00am to 9:05pm. Then the station's frequencies are handed over to Kossuth Rádió for the rest of the night.

History and profile 

Ever since its foundation, the Hungarian Radio P.L.C. has been a "citadel" of domestic information, and cultural life. Since December 1, 1925, the institution has had a decisive role in forming the Hungarian public opinion, and general taste.

It is true in spite of the fact that regular television broadcasts were launched in Hungary in 1958. Forty years later, in 1998, the dual media system was formed. Owing to that a regular competition started between the different mass media channels. Since commercial television and radio stations flooded the market primarily with entertainment industry products, the value-centred approach and program structure of the public service radio makes it, if possible, even more important to preserve its culture creating and broadcasting functions.

Hungarian Radio is a partner to the domestic audience and a link with the Hungarians over the borders, a chance for them to retain their national identity. Hungarian Radio could use the slogan often heard in radio commercials: "From clear source only". The buildings and studios of the Radio are located in Budapest, in the block between Bródy Sándor Street and Pollack Mihály Square. There are also two beautiful palaces in this area, one of them was owned earlier by the Eszterházy’s and the other one by the Károlyi family. The construction of Studio No. 6, the big orchestra studio, is linked with Georg von Békésy’s name, who was awarded the Nobel Prize for his acoustic researches in 1961.

On July 1, 2007, Radio Budapest cancelled the programming in foreign languages.

On December 22, 2012, All regional public service radio programs were cancelled and regional studios closed permanently.

On June 30, 2011, Magyar Radio closed its Radio Theatre Office and dismissed all dramaturgy staff.

Digital Radio Broadcasting (DAB+) experiments, that carried all public service stations, and were never licensed commercially, was terminated on September 5, 2020.

In popular culture
In 1974, Locomotiv GT's  Locomotiv GT (Dunhill Records 811) was released with a bumper sticker with the slogan "Radio Budapest Loves You!"

See also
 György Szepesi, Hungarian radio personality and sports executive

References

External links

 
 Kossuth Rádió Online
 Petőfi Rádió Online
 Bartók Rádió Online
 Magyar Rádió Streaming

Eastern Bloc mass media
Radio stations in Hungary
International broadcasters
European Broadcasting Union members
Hungarian-language radio stations
Multilingual broadcasters
Radio stations established in 1925
2015 disestablishments in Hungary
Government-owned companies of Hungary
MTVA (Hungary)
Publicly funded broadcasters
1925 establishments in Hungary